New Russia (or Novorossiya) was a historical region in the Russian Empire in the Southeastern Ukraine and the European part of Russia.

The term may also refer to:
New Russia (trading post), a Russian fur trading post on Yakutat Bay, Alaska in Russian America, established in 1795 and destroyed by the aboriginal Tlingit in 1805
New Russia Township, Lorain County, Ohio
Novorossiya (confederation), a proposed confederation of separatist entities in Ukraine
New Russia Party, a political party in Southeastern Ukraine
Novorossiya Governorate, in the aforementioned historical region in Russian Empire
Russia, after the fall of communism
New Russia, a hamlet south of Elizabethtown, New York
Novorossiya, a village in Primorsky Krai
Novaya Russia, a fictional civilization in Empire Earth